Eodorcadion egregium is a species of beetle in the family Cerambycidae. It was described by Reitter in 1897. It is known from Mongolia.

References

Dorcadiini
Beetles described in 1897